Begonia peltatifolia is a species of plant in the family Begoniaceae. It is endemic to China. It grows on limestone rocks and broad-leaved forests.

References

Flora of China
peltatifolia
Endangered plants
Taxonomy articles created by Polbot
Taxa named by Hui-lin Li